Abū Jaʿfar Mūsā ibn Muḥammad al-Mubarraqaʿ (Arabic: أبو جعفر موسى بن محمد المبرقع) was the son of ninth Twelver Shia Imam Muhammad al-Jawad and the younger brother of tenth Imam Ali al-Hadi.  He is known to be the ancestor of those Sayyids who use the title of his grandfather and eighth Imam Ali al-Rida as their surnames.  Most Rizvi, Ridawi, Razvi and Razavi Sayyids are the descendants of Musa al-Mubarraqa.  Most of them were found in Sabzevar, Iran earlier before their migration to Indian subcontinent.  There are still few villages and towns in India who trace their lineage to Musa al-Mubarraqa through his son Shahzada Ahmad bin Musa, few prominent towns in India with majority population of Rizvi Sayyids is in Zaidpur district Barabanki, Machli Gaon district Faizabad formerly, Rasoolpur Soni District Kaushambi, Wasa Dargah and Hallaur in state of Uttar Pradesh, India. Musa al-Mubarraqa was one of the pious and gentle of personalities of his time.

Musa al-Mubarraqa's short genealogy connecting him to the Islamic prophet Muhammad is mentioned below:

Musa al-Mubarraqa son of Muhammad al-Jawad son of Ali al-Rida son of Musa al-Kazim son of Ja'far al-Sadiq son of Muhammad al-Baqir son of Ali Zayn al-Abidin son of Husayn ibn Ali son of Ali ibn Abi Talib and Fatimah the daughter of the Islamic prophet Muhammad.

Birth and early life
Musa al-Mubarraqa was born in Medina on the 10th of Rajab 217 AH (11 august 832 CE), the same day when his father Imam Muhammad al-Jawad was born. He was 3 years younger to his brother Imam Ali al-Hadi. This was the joy of Imam Muhammad al-Jawad was expanded as on this very day he was blessed with a son by God.  He named him as Musa ibn Muhammad who was later conferred with the title of Mubarraqa which means (covered with veil).  Musa al-Mubarraqa was known for his beauty and Handsome personality and hence he never left home without a veil.

He loved his brother Imam Ali al-Hadi very much and used to take counsel with Him about the issues of jurisprudence. In 255 AH (868/869) at the age of 38 he left the city of Medina headed for Kufa in Iraq. In 256 AH (869/870) he continued his journey from Kufa to Persian city of Qom.  Most of the prominent scholars have confirmed that Musa al-Mubarraqa was the first one of the Rizvi Sayyids who set his foot in Qom for a permanent stay.  But when he entered this city the Arabs of Qom didn't approve his arrival and began to harass him.  Forced by the circumstances Musa al-Mubarraqa had to leave the city of Qom and arrived in the city of Kashan. In Kashan he was respected and warmly welcomed by all residents.

The ruler of the city of Kashan, Ahmed bin-Abdul-Aziz-bin-Dalaf-Ajli was extremely honored by the arrival of Musa al-Mubarraqa and offered him remarkable gifts every year.  Later when some lovers of Imam Muhammad al-Jawad came back to Qom and was informed about the whole incident which occurred at the arrival of Imam's son, made them feel very ashamed and sad. The prominent ones gathered the citizens of Qom and sent a group to Kashan to apologize for their act and also not only to ask for forgiveness but to insist in bringing him back to Qom permanently. The residents of Qom were forgiven and Musa al-Mubarraqa accepted their invitation.  In recompense, a beautiful well-made house was arranged and 20.000 Dirhams were offered to the respected son of the Imam Muhammad al-Jawad.  Musa al-Mubarraqa lived in Qom for the rest of his life and also invited his sisters to join him there.

Death and Burial
Musa al-Mubarraqa died on 22 Rabī` al-Ākhir 296 AH (18 January 909). He was 79 years old and was buried at the Cemetery of Chihil Akhtaran in the Iranian city of Qom. The funeral prayer was conducted by Ameer-e-Qom, Abbas-bin-Umar-o-Ghanavi. The sisters of Musa al-Mubarraqa are buried near the grave of their aunt Fatimah bint Musa also referred as Masumah al-Qom. Fatimah bint Musa or Masumah al-Qom was the sister of eighth Imam Ali al-Rida and daughter of seventh Imam Musa al-Kazim.

References

External links

Twelvers
Qom County
832 births
909 deaths
Husaynids
9th-century people from the Abbasid Caliphate